"United" is the fifth track and last single to be released from the album British Steel by heavy metal group Judas Priest. The song was written very much in the same vein as "Take On the World" from Killing Machine (Hell Bent for Leather in the U.S.) and meant to be a crowd shout-along. It is the fifth track and final song on the first side on the LP version. 

The single, with "Grinder" on the B-side, peaked at number 26 on the UK Singles Chart and spent a total of eight weeks on the chart. The "crowd" noise on the live version was enhanced by dub overlay using family members and friends.

Personnel
Rob Halford – vocals
K. K. Downing – guitars
Glenn Tipton – guitars
Ian Hill – bass guitar
 Dave Holland – drums

Charts

References

1980 singles
Judas Priest songs
British hard rock songs
1980 songs
CBS Records singles
Songs written by Rob Halford
Songs written by K. K. Downing
Songs written by Glenn Tipton